Defending champions Andrew Lapthorne and David Wagner defeated Dylan Alcott and Lucas Sithole in the final, 6–0, 3–6, 6–2 to win the quad doubles wheelchair tennis title at the 2015 Australian Open.

Seeds

Draw

References
 Main Draw

Wheelchair Quad Doubles
2015 Quad Doubles